Wow Philippines (stylized as WOW Philippines) was a tourism marketing campaign used to promote Tourism in the Philippines. The name of the campaign also served as the tagline of the campaign.

Background
Then Department of Tourism secretary Richard Gordon conceptualized the tagline "Wow Philippines" himself in 2002. The government agency then has a limited budget allotted for advertising. The promotional campaign was based on the 24-month Visit Philippines 2003 campaign by the World Tourism Organization which aimed to encourage the Filipino diaspora to visit tourism sites in the Philippines.

The Department of Tourism (DOT) then commissioned advertising firm BBDO Guerrero for the implementation of the campaign. This includes the coming up with promotional materials and the addition of "More than the Usual" as a sub slogan. Also the "Wow" of the campaign slogan is meant to be capitalized which doubles as an acronym. The meaning of the acronym varies depending on the usage of the slogan according to the government agency. The following are some possible meanings given by the DOT are the following:

Wealth of Wonders - tourist attractions
Warm Over Winter - beaches
Wild Over Water - water-based adventures
Wacko Over Wildlife - indigenous flora and fauna
Wear Our Wares
Watch Our Whales
Walk Our Walls - Intramuros

Impact and legacy
From 2003 to 2005, several tourism campaigns were conceptualized which include "Biyahe Tayo" (Pfizer and Perceptions Inc.), "I Love Philippines Biyahe Na!" (Smart) and "Pilipino sa Turismo'y Aktibo" (Philippine Tourism Authority, ABS-CBN and Star Records). The following personalities from the entertainment and political field lent their popularity to promote tourism to mainstream audiences during that time:

Freddie Aguilar
Sharon Cuneta
Ogie Alcasid
Janno Gibbs
Joey Ayala
Rey Valera
APO Hiking Society
Jolina Magdangal
Lea Salonga
Jessa Zaragoza
Francis Magalona
Rico J. Puno
April Boy Regino
Paolo Santos
Nina
John Lesaca
Rico Blanco
Jong Cuenco
Mike Villegas
Regine Velasquez-Alcasid
Gary Valenciano
Jamie Rivera
Ai-Ai delas Alas
Piolo Pascual
Heart Evangelista
Vhong Navarro
Erik Santos
Sheryn Regis
Karel Marquez
Frenchie Dy
Raki Vega
Ella May Saison
Lito Camo
Angelica Jones
Sandwich
Gloc-9
Akafellas
Marinel Santos
Dianne dela Fuente
Maoui David
Michelle Ayalde
Aliyah Parcs
Josh Santana
Divo Bayer
King
Jonathan Badon
Michael Cruz
Johann Escanan
Jericho Rosales (speaking only)
Jiro Manio (speaking only)
Roderick Paulate (speaking only)
Kris Aquino (speaking only)
Claudine Barretto (speaking only)
Kuh Ledesma (speaking only)
Charo Santos-Concio (speaking only)
Dolphy (speaking only)
Robert Dean S. Barbers (speaking only)
Gloria Macapagal Arroyo (speaking only)
Ted Failon (speaking only)

Between 2007 and 2012, foreign visits in the Philippines increased from about 3 million to 4.27 million. The campaign also generated 2800-4000 jobs.

A remake of "Biyahe Tayo" was produced in 2011 and was re-titled as "Pilipinas, Tara Na!" and also had expanded lyrics with the addition of other artists including Pepe Smith, Zsa Zsa Padilla, Martin Nievera, Jaya, Kitchie Nadal, Kyla, Jay R, Billy Crawford, Aiza Seguerra, Nikki Gil, Yeng Constantino and Sam Concepcion among others, with additional spoken parts from Dolphy and Manny Pacquiao. A few of the artists were absorbed from the original version such as Gibbs, Alcasid, Jim Paredes and Boboy Garovillo (of the APO Hiking Society) and Villegas.

Reception
In 2003, the Wow Philippines campaign was named as the Best Marketing Effort of a National Tourism Organization in the overall category in 2002 at the Internationale Tourismus Bourse.

See also
Pilipinas Kay Ganda

References

External links
 (Archived)

2002 in the Philippines
Tourism campaigns
Filipino advertising slogans
2002 neologisms
Department of Tourism (Philippines)